Kuttoor  is a village in Thiruvalla Taluk, Pathanamthitta district in the Indian state of Kerala.Kuttoor panchayathu which is under Thiruvalla assembly constituency and Pulikkizhu block panchayathu.

Location

This village has 12.16 square kilometer consist of 14 wards. Boundaries are Eraviperoor Panchayathu, Kadalimangalam River, Manimalayar and Varattar.Early years Kuttoor was in Kollam district and later Alappuzha  District and now it under Pathanamthitta.

Demographics
Total area is 1203 hectors and total population 18433 as per 2001 census.

History

Kuttoor was a capital of Thekkumkoor Kingdom.  Dritharashramala (known as Pottanmala ), Kottappuram, Bhoothakkuzhi, Chakrashalanakkadavu are the historically relevant places which were in Kuttoor. The name Kuttoor came from Kottayoor-Kottoor.

Transportation

Kerala State Road Transport Corporation has a depot at Tiruvalla (station code: TVLA) which is one among the 29 major depots in the state. Its 4 km from Kuttoor. KSRTC operates long distance and interstate bus services from the Tiruvalla depot. KSRTC operates daily Interstate Airbus service to Bangalore from Tiruvalla. 
Tiruvalla railway station (station code: TRVL) and Chenagannur (station code: CGNR) railway station are near to Kuttoor. Thiruvalla railway station is the sole railway station in Pathanamthitta district. Both stations are only 4 km from Kuttoor. Most trains stop here. Another major railway station is  Kottayam railway station which is 25 km from Kuttoor. The nearest airports are Cochin International Airport (105 km) and Trivandrum airport (126 km).

Geography

The topography of Kuttoor comprises plains, paddy fields, and small ranges. There are paddy fields in Ottam Etukadavu and Kothavithiruthi.  Main crops are paddy, coconut, cassava, sugarcane, banana, and pepper.  The main water source of the village is Manamalayar.  There are smaller sources of water like Varattar, Madhurampuzha, Kadhalimangalathar and Ettukadavu stream.

Politics
The current Panchayathu is under governed by Left Democratic Front, LDF. Out of 14 wards, 8 seat won by LDF, BJP 3, UDF 3.

Current MLA is Adv.Mathew T Thomas. He is currently the minister for water resources in Government of Kerala, State President and Legislature Party Leader of the Janata Dal (Secular). 
Current MP Pathanamthitta (Lok Sabha constituency) is Anto Antony

Notable personalities

Temples
Vanchimoottil Devi Temple , Thalayar
Sankara Narayana Darma Sastra Kshetram, Kuttoor  
Sree Kailasa Nadha Uma Maheswara Kshetram , Thengeli  
Puthoorkavu Kshetram , Kuttoor 
Valliyilkavu devi Kshetram, Thengeli 
Dritharashramala Kshetram , Pottanmala
Kadalimangalam devi temple,Venpala

Churches

St'Mary'Orthodox Syrian Church, Venpala
St'Mary's Knanaya Church, Thengali 
St'George Orthodox Church Thengali
St'Mary's Knanaya Catholic Church Thengali
St'Mary's Knanaya Church Kuttoor
St'George Orthodox Church, Kallumkal Venpala
New India Church of God, Thengali
New India Church of God, Kuttoor
Bretheran Assembly Hall, Kuttoor
All Saint's CSI Church, Kuttoor
Salem Marthoma Church Thymaravumkara

Hospitals

 Pushpagiri Medical College Hospital           3.1 km
 Dr. K.M Cherian Institute of Medical Sciences, Kallissery 4.1 km
 Taluk Headquarters Hospital (Govt.Hospital,Thiruvalla) 4.3 km
 Tiruvalla Medical Mission Hospital           4.8 km
 Believers Church Medical College Hospital     7.0 km
 St.Gregorious Medical Mission Multi-Speciality Hospital, Parumala (Parumala Hospital) 12.0 km

References

External links
 LSGD Kerala
 
 http://vaikhari.org/thiruvalla.html
 Information about kerala

Villages in Pathanamthitta district
Villages in Thiruvalla taluk